Algie Knoll is a rounded ice-covered elevation rising to  between Silver Ridge and the mouth of Algie Glacier in Churchill Mountains, Antarctica. Named by Advisory Committee on Antarctic Names in association with Algie Glacier.

References
 

Hills of the Ross Dependency
Shackleton Coast